Snipe, in woodworking, is a noticeably deeper cut on the leading and/or trailing end of a board after having passed through a thickness planer or jointer. Its cause, in a jointer, is an out-feed table which is set too low relative to the cutter head, or in a thickness planer, an unnecessarily high setting of the Bed rollers of the in-feed table or a pressure bar which is set too high. The term has its origin in forestry where it is applied to a sloping surface or bevel cut on the fore end of a log to ease dragging. (OED)

References

External links
Fencing

Woodworking